Bank of Industry and Mine (Bank Sana't-e ve Ma'dæn) is an Iranian government owned specialized bank located in Tehran, Iran. It endeavours to increase economic growth through the development of industry and mining. Its purpose is to be an economic enterprise, providing banking facilities, development and investment in order to advance Iran's economy. It aims to promote the participation of the private sector in the fields of industry, mining, modern technologies and their associated services.

In 2017, A Chinese state-owned investment firm provided a $10 billion credit line for five Iranian banks, including the Bank of Industry and Mine, "in order to support projects in the country".   In light of US sanctions, The bank, and its subsidiaries, have had financial dealings with Danish and German Banks.

See also

Banking in Iran
Industry of Iran
Mining in Iran
Iran Chamber of Commerce Industries and Mines
The Bank of Industry
Geological Survey and Mineral Exploration of Iran

References

External links 
Bank of Industry and Mine

Banks of Iran
Iranian companies established in 1983
Banks established in 1983
Ministry of Industry, Mine and Trade (Iran)
Iranian entities subject to the U.S. Department of the Treasury sanctions